Mulberry is an unincorporated community in Barrow County, in the U.S. state of Georgia.

History
A post office called Mulberry was established in 1838, and remained in operation until 1914. The community was named for mulberry trees near the original town site.

References

Unincorporated communities in Barrow County, Georgia
Unincorporated communities in Georgia (U.S. state)